Rakthabandham is a 1951 Indian Malayalam-language film, directed by M. R. Vittal and produced by N. K. Karunakaran Pillai. The film stars Kalaikkal Kumaran and T. R. Omana. The film has a musical score by S. M. Subbaiah Naidu and S. N. Chaami (S. N. Ranganathan). It is the only Malayalam film directed by Velswami Kavi. It is the debut Malayalam film of S. D. Subbiah and the debut film of Paravoor Bharathan (as a bank peon), Kuttappa Bhagavathar, and lyricist Swami Brahmavrathan. The movie also introduced R. S. Prabhu to Malayalam cinema.

Cast
 T. R. Omana
 Kalaikkal Kumaran
 Kuttappan Bhagavathar
 S. J. Dev
 Vaikkam Mani
 Pisharody
 Meenakshi (Old)
 Cherthala Vasudeva Kurup
 Rajamma
 S. D. Subbayya
 Paravur Bharathan (debut)

References

1951 films
1950s Malayalam-language films